Rosemary Peres Ribeiro (born March 17, 1958) is a former international butterfly swimmer from Brazil, who participated in a Summer Olympics for her native country.

At 13 years old, in the 1971 Pan American Games, in Cali, she won a bronze medal in the 4×100-metre freestyle. She also finished 5th in the 200-metre individual medley.

Participated at the inaugural World Aquatics Championships in 1973 Belgrade, where she finished 18th in the 100-metre butterfly.

In 1974, she broke the South American record in the 100-metre freestyle, with a time of 1:00.4. 

She was at the 1975 World Aquatics Championships in Cali. In the 200-metre butterfly, she finished with a time of 2:23.24, near from her personal best at this moment, 2:22.06, but not going to the finals. In the 100-metre freestyle, she finished 20th, with a time of 1:01.91.

She was at the 1975 Pan American Games, in Mexico City, where she won two bronze medals, in the 200-metre butterfly, and in the 4×100-metre freestyle. She also finished 6th in the 100-metre butterfly, and 6th in the 100-metre freestyle.

At the 1976 Summer Olympics, in Montreal, she swam the 100-metre and 200-metre butterfly, not reaching the finals.

She was at the 1983 Pan American Games, in Caracas, where she finished 8th in the 100-metre butterfly.

References

1958 births
Living people
Brazilian female butterfly swimmers
Brazilian female freestyle swimmers
Swimmers at the 1971 Pan American Games
Swimmers at the 1975 Pan American Games
Swimmers at the 1976 Summer Olympics
Swimmers at the 1983 Pan American Games
Olympic swimmers of Brazil
Pan American Games bronze medalists for Brazil
Pan American Games medalists in swimming
Medalists at the 1971 Pan American Games
Medalists at the 1975 Pan American Games
21st-century Brazilian women
20th-century Brazilian women